Man About the House is a 1974 British comedy film, a spinoff of the sitcom of the same name, starring all of the main cast of the series. It was the last in a series of big screen adaptations of popular television comedies made by Hammer Films, although a film of George & Mildred (featuring Yootha Joyce and Brian Murphy in the title roles) was made in 1980 by another studio.

Plot
The Ropers learn that Mr. Pluthero, an estate agent and developer, wants to buy their building. The room-mates circulate a petition to stop the development, which attracts the interest of MP Sir Edmund, who keeps a mistress in the building.

Cast

 Richard O'Sullivan as Robin Tripp
 Paula Wilcox as Chrissy Plummer
 Sally Thomsett as Jo
 Yootha Joyce as Mrs Roper
 Brian Murphy as Mr Roper
 Peter Cellier as Morris Pluthero
 Doug Fisher as Larry Simmonds
 Arthur Lowe as Mr Spiros
 Bill Maynard as Chef
 Aimi MacDonald as Hazel Lovett
 Patrick Newell as Sir Edmund Weir
 Andria Lawrence as Miss Amelia Bird
 Bill Grundy as the Interviewer
 Michael Ward as Mr Gideon
 Julian Orchard as the Producer
 Aubrey Morris as the Lecturer
 Bill Pertwee as the Postman
 Johnny Briggs as the Milkman
 Melvyn Hayes as Nigel
 Berry Cornish as the P.A.
 Bill Sawyer as the Chauffeur
 Mark Rogers as Boy Scout
 Pauline Peart as the Secretary
 Arthur Hewlett as the Elderly Man
 Annie Leake as the Tweedy Lady
 Corinne Skinner as the Housewife
 Michael Robbins as the Doorman
 Norman Mitchell as Arthur Mulgrove
 Jack Smethurst, Rudolph Walker and Spike Milligan as themselves

Production
The film started shooting in March 1974 at Elstree Studios in London, finishing on 12 April.

Reception
The film was a hit, taking £90,000 in London alone.

The critics were less impressed, with David Parkinson writing in the Radio Times: "Great cast, shame about the script ... The material is thinner than a bedsit wall."

References

External links
 

1974 films
British comedy films
1974 comedy films
Films based on television series
Man About the House
Films scored by Christopher Gunning
Films shot at EMI-Elstree Studios
1970s English-language films
1970s British films